Matthew Ebden and Jamie Murray defeated Hugo Nys and Jan Zieliński in the final, 6–4, 6–2 to win the doubles tennis title at the 2022 Winston-Salem Open.

Marcelo Arévalo and Matwé Middelkoop were the reigning champions, but chose not to participate.

Seeds

Draw

Draw

References

External links
 Main draw

Winston-Salem Open - Doubles
2022 Doubles